Delavan Township is located in Tazewell County, Illinois. As of the 2010 census, its population was 2,061 and it contained 902 housing units.

History
Delavan Township is named for Edward C. Delavan, a temperance advocate from Albany, New York.

Geography

Demographics

References

External links
City-data.com
Illinois State Archives

Townships in Tazewell County, Illinois
Peoria metropolitan area, Illinois
Townships in Illinois